Here is a list of assets owned by American global telecommunications conglomerate Comcast.

Comcast Holdings Corporation 
Xfinity (Comcast Cable Communications, LLC)
 Comcast Business
 Comcast Interactive Media
 StreamSage
 Comcast Cable Holdings, LLC (formerly AT&T Broadband Corporation)
 Comcast MO Group, LLC (formerly Media One or Bell West)
 Comcast MO of Delaware, LLC
 CN900 (Michigan)
 CN81 (Indiana)
 Comcast Wholesale
 Xfinity Mobile
 Effectv
 Xfinity Streampix
 Xumo
 Comcast Spectacor operating sports and entertainment venues
Spectra
 ComcastTIX
 Maine Mariners (ECHL)
 Paciolan
 Philadelphia Flyers
 Gritty
 On the Fly Productions
 Philadelphia Wings
 Philadelphia Fusion (CS Philadelphia OW Team, LLC)
 Wells Fargo Center (Philadelphia)
 T1 Entertainment & Sports (34% with SK Telecom and Highland Capital)
 T1
 In Demand Networks (33.3% with Cox Communications and Charter Communications)
 Comcast Spotlight (Advertising)
 Comcast Technology Solutions
 Comcast Ventures (formerly Comcast Interactive Capital)
 Headend in the Sky (HITS)
 FreeWheel
 Watchwith
 iMedia Brands Inc. (12.5%)
 ShopHQ
 Hitz
 Leisure Arts
 Midco (49%)
 Music Choice LLC (Minority stake with Cox Communications, Charter Communications, Microsoft, Arris International and Sony Corporation of America)
 Music Choice

NBCUniversal

Sky Group 
Challenge
 Pick
 Sky Arts
 Sky Atlantic
 Sky Cinema
 Sky Comedy
 Sky Crime
 Sky Documentaries
 Sky Max
 Sky Nature
 Sky News
 Sky News Radio
 Sky News Arabia (50% with Abu Dhabi Media Investment Corporation)
 Sky Replay
 Sky Showcase
 Sky Sports
 Sky Sports F1
 Sky Sports News
 Sky Sports Racing (Joint venture with Arena Racing Company)
 Sky Box Office
 Sky Sports Box Office
 Sky 3D
 Sky Witness
 A&E Networks UK (A&E Television Networks (UK) Ltd/BSkyB History Ltd)
 Blaze
 Crime & Investigation
 Sky History
 Sky History2
 Nickelodeon UK Ltd (Paramount Networks UK & Australia (60%)/Sky Group (40%))
 Nickelodeon
 Nick Jr.
 Nick Jr. Too
 Nicktoons
 Paramount UK Partnership (Paramount Pictures UK/Sky Group (25%))
 Comedy Central
 Comedy Central Extra
 Sky Subscriber Services
 Sky In-Home Services
 Sky Home Communications
 Sports Internet Group
 British Interactive Broadcasting Holdings
 Aura Sports
 Aura Play
 Sky UK
 Now (Sky)
 Sky Broadband
 The Cloud
 DTV Services Ltd (Minority stake with Arqiva, BBC, ITV plc and Channel Four Television Corporation)
 Freeview
 Sky Go
 Freesat from Sky
 Sky Ireland
 Sky Deutschland
 Sky Switzerland
 Sky Italia
 Sky Q
 Amstrad
Sky Studios
Jupiter Entertainment
Skybound Stories (Joint venture with Skybound Entertainment)
Ginx TV Ltd (Joint venture with ITV plc)
Ginx TV
 Love Productions
Transistor Films
Znak & Co.

Former assets

Divested
 A&E Networks (15.8%, with The Walt Disney Company and Hearst)
 Bad Wolf Ltd (minority stake, with Access Entertainment and HBO), sold to Sony Pictures Television
 MGM Holdings (20%, with Sony Corporation of America, Providence Equity Partners, TPG Capital, DLJ Merchant Banking Partners and Quadrangle Group), split in 2010 due to the emergence from bankruptcy, now owned by Amazon.
 QVC: Comcast sold its majority stake to Liberty Media in 2003
 Speed Channel: joint venture with Cox Communications and Fox Entertainment Group; Fox acquired Comcast and Cox's stakes in 2001
 Time Warner Entertainment (26%, with Time Warner Inc.): Comcast sold its 26% stake to Time Warner Inc. (now Warner Bros. Discovery) in 2003.
 TV One: 50% joint venture with Radio One, which acquired Comcast's stake in 2015
 The Weather Company – with private equity firms Bain Capital and The Blackstone Group: Originally a parent company of The Weather Channel. In January 2016, it was acquired by IBM.
 The Weather Channel – with private equity firms Bain Capital and The Blackstone Group: sold to Entertainment Studios.
 Pearl Studio (formerly known as Oriental DreamWorks) (45%, with China Media Capital, Shanghai Media Group and Shanghai Alliance Investment): NBCUniversal sold its stake in the studio in 2018 to CMC for restructuring and possibly problems with Chinese antitrust investigation.
 AwesomenessTV – sold to Paramount Global.

Dormant or shuttered

Xfinity
 Adelphia Communications Corporation: assets acquired by Time Warner Cable and Comcast in 2006
 Comcast Entertainment Television (CET)
 Comcast Television 2 (Michigan)
 Commuter Cable
 ExerciseTV (with Time Warner Cable, New Balance, and Jake Steinfeld)
 Group W Cable
 Susquehanna Communications
 TVWorks (67% with Cox Communications)
 MetaTV
 Xfinity 3D
 Patriot Media
 MOJO HD (with Cox Communications and Time Warner Cable)

NBCUniversal
 Anime Selects
 AZN Television: TV channel focused on Asian and Asian-American culture; formerly known as International Channel from its foundation in 1996 to 2005; shut down in 2008
 Chiller
 Cloo
 Comcast/Charter Sports Southeast (with Charter Communications), shut down due to the loss of SEC rights to ESPN's SEC Network
 The Comcast Network
 DailyCandy
 Fearnet (with Lions Gate Entertainment and Sony Pictures Entertainment)
 G4 (88% with Dish Network): first incarnation was closed down on December 31, 2014; meanwhile, second incarnation of the channel which operated by sister company Comcast Spectacor was closed down on November 18, 2022.
 Gramercy Pictures
 Qubo (with Ion Media Networks, Scholastic Entertainment, Classic Media and Corus Entertainment): A children's programming block launched on September 9, 2006. NBC and Telemundo discontinued their Qubo blocks in 2012 after Comcast acquired NBCUniversal. Following the acquisition of Ion Media by the E. W. Scripps Company on January 7, 2021, the Qubo Channel ceased operations on February 28, 2021.

Sky 

 Sky Vision: Folded into NBCUniversal Global Distribution

See also
 Lists of corporate assets
 List of communities serviced by Comcast

References
 Columbia Journalism Review

Comcast
Comcast